Sahitya Akademi Award is given each year, since 1955, by Sahitya Akademi (India's National Academy of Letters), to writers and their works, for their outstanding contribution to the upliftment of Indian literature and Hindi literature in particular. No Award was conferred in 1962.

Recipients

See also
 List of Hindi language poets
 Sahitya Akademi

References

External links
 Official listing of Sahitya Akademi Awards in Hindi-language

Sahitya Akademi Award

Hindi
Sahitya Akademi Award winners